Vladimir Mikhaylovich Smirnov (born 7 March 1964) is a Kazakh former cross-country skier of Russian descent who raced from the 1982 until 1991 for the USSR and, later, for Kazakhstan. He is the first Olympic champion from independent Kazakhstan and the most decorated Olympian in history of Kazakhstan. He is also a vice president of the International Biathlon Union. Smirnov is a former member of International Olympic Committee.

Early life
Smirnov was born to Russian parents in Shchuchinsk, Kazakh SSR. During the Soviet period, he trained at the Armed Forces sports society in Alma-Ata.

Career

Smirnov made his debut in the FIS Cross-Country World Cup on 18 December 1982 at Davos in a 15 km race, finishing in a 17th place. His first victory came in 1986, a classic style 15 km in Kavgolovo (URS). Smirnov gained a total of 30 victories in the World Cup, with 21 second and 15 third places. In 1994, he won the aggregate World Cup, thanks to seven victories in the course of the season.

At the FIS Nordic World Ski Championships from 1987 to 1997, Smirnov totalled four gold (1989: 30 km, 1995: 10 km, 10 km + 15 km combined pursuit, 30 km), four silver (1987: 4x10 km, 1991: 30 km, 1993: 10 km, 10 km + 15 km combined pursuit) and three bronze medals (1991: 15 km, 1993: 30 km, 1995: 50 km). His best result was in Thunder Bay, Ontario (1995), when he won three events.

In 1994, he received the Holmenkollen Medal (shared with Lyubov Yegorova and Espen Bredesen). Smirnov also won twice at the Holmenkollen ski festival with a 15 km win in 1994 and a 50 km win in 1995.

A very regular and effective cross-country skier, especially in long-distance classic style races, Smirnov took part to the Winter Olympics from 1988 to 1998. His best known victory was the 50 km gold medal at the 1994 Winter Olympics in Lillehammer, the first Olympic gold medal for Kazakhstan. He was one of the leading characters of that Olympics, as his unending rivalry with home ever-winning Bjørn Dæhlie had gained him the affection of the Norwegian audience. He also became good friends with his rival Dæhlie, even participating with Dæhlie in several popular Norwegian TV shows.

In 1998 Nagano Winter Olympics, Smirnov was flag-bearer of Kazakhstan Olympic team and won the bronze medal in the 25 km pursuit event.

Smirnov headed the bid committee to have Almaty, Kazakhstan, host the 2014 Winter Olympics, a bid that failed to make the short list that was announced by the International Olympic Committee on 22 June 2006. In 2011, Smirnov participated at the opening ceremony of 2011 Asian Winter Games in Astana.

Personal life
Smirnov moved to Sweden in 1991 and lives in the city of Sundsvall, where he was a co-founder and co-owner of a local brewery. He is married to Valentina Smirnova, and they have two daughters – Anna and Karolina. He became a Swedish citizen in 1998. Smirnov speaks four languages: Russian, German, English and Swedish.

Cross-country skiing results
All results are sourced from the International Ski Federation (FIS).

Olympic Games
 7 medals – (1 gold, 4 silver, 2 bronze)

World Championships
 11 medals – (4 gold, 4 silver, 3 bronze)

World Cup

Season titles
 2 titles – (2 overall)

Season standings

Individual podiums
 30 victories 
 66 podiums

Team podiums

 2 victories 
 8 podiums 

Note:  Until the 1999 World Championships and the 1994 Winter Olympics, World Championship and Olympic races were included in the World Cup scoring system.

References

Further reading

External links

 
 Vladimir Smirnov at the 1998 Nagano Olympics

1964 births
Cross-country skiers at the 1988 Winter Olympics
Cross-country skiers at the 1992 Winter Olympics
Cross-country skiers at the 1994 Winter Olympics
Cross-country skiers at the 1998 Winter Olympics
Holmenkollen medalists
Holmenkollen Ski Festival winners
Soviet male cross-country skiers
Kazakhstani people of Russian descent
Living people
Olympic cross-country skiers of the Soviet Union
Olympic cross-country skiers of the Unified Team
Olympic cross-country skiers of Kazakhstan
Olympic gold medalists for Kazakhstan
Olympic silver medalists for Kazakhstan
Olympic bronze medalists for Kazakhstan
Olympic silver medalists for the Soviet Union
Olympic bronze medalists for the Soviet Union
Olympic medalists in cross-country skiing
FIS Nordic World Ski Championships medalists in cross-country skiing
FIS Cross-Country World Cup champions
Medalists at the 1998 Winter Olympics
People from Akmola Region
Medalists at the 1994 Winter Olympics
Medalists at the 1988 Winter Olympics
Stockviks SF skiers
Asian Games medalists in cross-country skiing
Cross-country skiers at the 1999 Asian Winter Games
International Olympic Committee members
Asian Games gold medalists for Kazakhstan
Asian Games silver medalists for Kazakhstan
Medalists at the 1999 Asian Winter Games